The New Guinea Council was a unicameral representative body formed in the Dutch colony of Netherlands New Guinea in 1961.

History

Prior to the formation of the New Guinea Council, there existed a Council of Directors, which consisted of the heads of government departments.
Dutch authorities initially began to establish local government bodies such as village councils and regional councils. The New Guinea Council was inaugurated on 5 April 1961 with 28 council members, 16 of whom had been elected in elections held during January 1961. The council's inauguration was attended by representatives from Australia, France, the Netherlands, New Zealand, the United Kingdom and other Pacific Forum nations with exception of the United States.

The council was requested to make its wishes on self-determination known within a year. During an emergency session the council drafted a national manifesto and symbols including the Morning Star flag for a new national identity to be known as "West Papua".

Council officials 
Frits Sollewijn Gelpke was Council Chairman and Nicolaas Jouwe was Vice-Chair. J. W. Trouw was the Clerk of the Council.

Council building 
A council building was built in Hollandia from 1960 to 1961 and used until the abolition of the council in 1962. Currently the building houses the regional legislature of Papua,  ( or DPR Papua).

Gallery

See also
United Nations Transitional Authority in Cambodia

References 

Defunct unicameral legislatures
Legislatures of country subdivisions
Dutch political institutions
Organizations based in Netherlands New Guinea
1961 establishments in Netherlands New Guinea
1962 disestablishments in the Netherlands
1962 disestablishments in Indonesia